George Champion may refer to:

 George Champion (cricketer) (1867–1933), English cricketer
 George Champion (politician) (1713–1754), English MP
 George Charles Champion (1851–1927), English entomologist